John James McAliskey (born 2 September 1984) is a former professional footballer who played in the Football League for Huddersfield Town, Torquay United, Wrexham and Mansfield Town. Born in Huddersfield, England, he reprented the Republic of Ireland at under-21 level.

Career
He first played for Huddersfield Town during the 2003–04 season.

He was sent on loan to Torquay United during the 2005–06 season, due to lack of match action. He has again failed to make an impression, and was sent out on loan to Wrexham.

On 9 May 2007, he was released by the Terriers signing for Mansfield Town on 7 June on a one-year deal. After just 16 League games he was released by Mansfield on 27 March 2008.

He has also played for Alfreton Town, Salford City and Witton Albion.

On 20 November 2009, Altrincham signed McAliskey. Since leaving the Robins, he has played for both Northwich Victoria and Matlock Town, on loan.

As of 28 February 2012, McAliskey has last been known to be playing for Royal Dolphins of the Huddersfield District League Second Division.

References

External links

1984 births
Living people
Footballers from Huddersfield
English footballers
Republic of Ireland association footballers
Republic of Ireland under-21 international footballers
Association football forwards
Huddersfield Town A.F.C. players
Torquay United F.C. players
Wrexham A.F.C. players
Mansfield Town F.C. players
Alfreton Town F.C. players
Salford City F.C. players
Witton Albion F.C. players
Altrincham F.C. players
Northwich Victoria F.C. players
Matlock Town F.C. players
English Football League players
National League (English football) players